Alex McVey is an American fine artist and illustrator from Texas, mostly known for his work on high-end limited edition books and album art.  He has illustrated the works of Stephen King, William Peter Blatty, Brian Keene, Joe R. Lansdale, and others.
McVey is known for his work within the horror genre, and for his use of a variety of styles, subject matter, and media.
Clients include:  Cemetery Dance Publications, Bloodletting Press, Weird Tales, Straight Line Stitch, Centipede Press, Team Y&R, and others.

Selected bibliography
Alex McVey has illustrated works for:

Authors
Stephen King
William Peter Blatty
Kate Morton
Joe R. Lansdale
Brian Keene
Peter Straub
John Shirley
Dean Koontz
John Farris
Ronald Kelly
Ray Garton
Richard Matheson
Joe Hill
Norman Partridge
Gahan Wilson
Christa Faust
Wrath James White
J. F. Gonzalez
Nate Southard
Ramsey Campbell
Gary Braunbeck
James Newman
Greg F. Gifune
Richard Dean Starr
James A. Moore
Douglas Clegg
Edward Lee

Companies and publishers
Merde Skateboards
Harley-Davidson
Team Y&R

Film
Troublemaker Studios
New Line Cinema
Bamfer Productions

Book & magazine publishers
Apex
Bloodletting Press
Cemetery Dance Publications
Centipede Press
Delirium Books
Earthling Publications
Full Moon Press
Lonely Road Books
Necessary Evil Press
Night Shade Books
Paradox Magazine
Thunderstorm Books
Weird Tales

Role playing games
Z-Man Games
Hero Games
Fantasy Flight Games
Steve Jackson Games

Musicians and albums
Straight Line Stitch When Skies Wash Ashore and The Word Made Flesh
Elisium's Things They Carried album
King Phaze

External links
Alex McVey's official website
Article on Alex McVey from ghoulfriday.com
Alex McVey - "Building the Perfect Werewolf"

American illustrators
20th-century American painters
American male painters
21st-century American painters
Artists from Texas
Horror artists
Living people
Year of birth missing (living people)
20th-century American male artists